The Women's 1 m springboard competition of the 2018 European Aquatics Championships was held on 10 August 2018.

Results
The preliminary round was started at 09:30. The final was held at 15:15.

Green denotes finalists

References

Women's 1 m springboard